Minoru Saitō  is a Japanese solo yachtsman and one of the most notable veteran ocean sailboat racers in the world. He became the oldest person at age  to do a solo circumnavigation of the globe. He has successfully made eight solo circumnavigations.

On October 16, 2004 Saitō left Japan on his yacht Shuten-dohji II (named after Shuten-dōji, a mythical demon who lived in the 10th century; it is also literally translated in English as "Drunkard's Child," and sometimes jokingly westernized by other sailors as "Shoot Your Doggy") and returned 233 days later to complete his 7th circumnavigation, non-stop. He finished his 8th solo circumnavigation, this time the "wrong way around," on September 17, 2011, after 1,080 days. He was 77 years old on completion.

Biography 
Saitō was born in Asakusa, Tokyo.

He has participated three times in the most prestigious and grueling race in the sailing world, the single-handed, around-the-globe competition originally called the BOC Challenge, then Around Alone, and renamed the Velux 5 Oceans Race which commenced in 2006. The races are run in legs, with stop-overs for rest and repair in several countries along the way.

In his continuing career, Saitō has become the most experienced blue-water yachtsman from Japan with transoceanic voyages totaling more than  — almost exactly the distance to the moon. He has started and finished eight solo circumnavigations of the Earth, the seventh one non-stop, achieving several international honors and world records.

Saitō is quite well known among American, European and Australian sailing enthusiasts, and increasingly so in Japan as his international renown becomes better appreciated in his home country.

In January, 2007, Saitō was named the recipient of the highly vaunted 2006 Blue Water Medal awarded to one outstanding sailor each year by the Cruising Club of America. This recognition is considered the top international award for adventure sailing.

In his achievements, he joins such solo sailing luminaries as Joshua Slocum (1844-1909); Sir Robin Knox-Johnston (1939-); Mike Plant (1950-1992); and Isabelle Autissier (1956-).

In January 2012, Saitō was named recipient of the Juan Sebastian del Cano Award, given by the 45,000-member United States Power Squadrons. The award is named for the navigator who finished the first-ever circumnavigation of the world led by Ferdinand Magellan in 1522. Saitō was cited for successfully completing his 8th solo circumnavigation at age 77, an international record, as well as for his nearly 40-year sailing career that includes a non-stop solo circumnavigation in 2005 at age 71. It was only the second time the award to honor adventure boating has been presented by the organization.

The 8th solo circumnavigation – the "wrong way around" 

Sailing west-to-east to circle the globe in a wind-driven craft is no small feat but rarely is the plan to go westwardly instead — the "wrong way around" — against the prevailing winds, currents and waves. This route puts immense stresses on the vessel and crew, and for solo sailors, days can pass with little or no sleep when the going is particularly hard.

Few single-handers have attempted such a feat and certainly none near Saitō's age — when he finished this voyage he was 77 years and 8 months old.

Instead, it took almost 3 years for him to successfully complete the circumnavigation.

Saitō's vessel encountered a number of problems. He stopped for repair in Sydney, Australia in November 2008, in Fremantle, Australia in December and in Cape Town, S.Africa in February. He was disabled with rudder problems at Cape Horn, Chile in April, 2009. He was towed to the world's southernmost city, Punta Arenas, Chile, where he over-wintered and carried out repairs. A second attempt around the Horn was successful, but sail and engine problems forced him to return to Punta Arenas, where he again attended to repairs. He restarted the circumnavigation in late January, 2010. He still had engine problems and stopped at Valdivia, Chile in February–March 2010 for repair. He then made a long stop in Honolulu, USA (June 2010-May 2011) and shorter stops in Galapagos, Ecuador and Ogasawara, Japan.

He finished in Yokohama on September 17, 2011, 1,080 days after his departure.

Saitō's single-handed westward circumnavigation set two of the most-unchallengeable records of all sports: a solo circumnavigation at age 77 years and 8 months, and his 8th time around the globe solo in a sailing yacht.

Notes

References

External links
 https://web.archive.org/web/20050608235112/http://www.tspsjapan.org/Minoru_Saito.html
 http://www.moy.org/singlehandedhof.htm 
 https://web.archive.org/web/20060223105633/http://www.theoceans.net/news.php?id=158
 chart of 2004-5 record trip (in Japanese)

1934 births
Living people
Japanese sailors
Single-handed circumnavigating sailors
Blue Water Medal recipients